Sky Box Office is Sky plc's pay-per-view television system in the UK and Ireland.

Sky Box Office may also refer to:

 Sky Box Office (New Zealand), a SKY Network Television pay-per-view system which shows movies